Daniel Peploe Peploe (15 February 1829 – 4 November 1887) was a Conservative Party politician. He was elected Conservative MP for Herefordshire constituency in 1874 but lost the seat at the next election in 1880.

References

External links
 

Conservative Party (UK) MPs for English constituencies
UK MPs 1874–1880
1829 births
1887 deaths
People from Weobley